King in the Ring is a kickboxing tournament that is held in New Zealand.

Tournament format
King in the Ring is a last man standing eight man tournament that is complete in one night. Seven boxing bouts will be contested in one night, each bout being scheduled for three rounds, each round being three minutes with a minute break in between rounds. If after three rounds a fight is declared a draw, an extra round may be required to determine the winner. Judges will not be encouraged to draw fights but will be accepted in the case of close contests. In the event of a draw after a fourth round, the winner will be decided in consultation with the Referee and fight Supervisor. If an injury occurs to a winning boxer that eliminates him from the competition, he is to be replaced by the most deserving or merit worthy losing boxer from the earlier competition or reserve fight winner as decided by the Supervisor. A random draw out of a hat will be conducted to determine which fighters contest each other in four quarter final matches. There is a maximum knockdown rule, where a boxer can not be knocked down more than 3 times in the night.

History

King in the Ring 100 kg I
The Tournament was competed on 20 May 2011 at ASB Stadium, Auckland, New Zealand. The undercard featured two WKBF World title bouts, including Roger Earp vs Joe Concha & Bronwyn Wylie vs Tegan Papasergi. The undercard also featured Muay Thai NZ title bout with James Gordon vs Rod McSwain. The opening bout of the night was ONeil Wiperi vs Ricky Hita.

King in the Ring 72 kg I
The Tournament was competed on 28 October 2011 at ASB Stadium, Auckland, New Zealand. The undercard featured a WKBF World Title Bout with Antz Nansen vs Eric Nosa. The undercard also featured Joey Baylon vs Chris Wells and Travis Green vs Ricky Hita.

King in the Ring 62 kg I
The Tournament was competed on 19 May 2012 at ASB Stadium, Auckland, New Zealand. The undercard featured Jake Crane vs Colin Chu, Michelle Preston vs Nikki Bigwood and Aaron Goddard vs Daniel Harris.

King in the Ring 100+ kg I
The Tournament was competed on 1 September 2012 at ASB Stadium, Auckland, New Zealand. The undercard featured William Robson De Oliveira vs Josh Marsters, Pane Haraki vs "Lightning" Mike Angove and Amateur Kickboxing WKBF NZ Title Fight James Eades vs Pati Afoa.

King in the Ring 86 kg I
The Tournament was competed on 13 April 2013 at ASB Stadium, Auckland, New Zealand. The undercard featured Yousef Almesfer vs Andrew Watson, Mikaera Povey vs Zak Fatamaka, WMC Lightweight Title Ra Redden vs Joey Baylon, Brendan Varty vs Edwin Samy, Richie Hardcore vs Hayden Todd and Andrew Peck and Tafa Misipati.

King in the Ring 100 kg II
The Tournament was competed on 9 November 2013 at ASB Stadium, Auckland, New Zealand. The undercard featured Sanchai Aung vs Joey "The Filipino Kid" Baylon, Gaella "The Slayer" Nixon  Baybee “Pitbull” Nansen, Benson Eves vs Wayne Hehea, Nikolas "The Greek" Charalampous vs Scott Taliauli, Edwin "Electric" Samy vs Mikaera "Shotgun" Povey, Tony Angelov vs Andrew Bannam and Pati "The Arsenal" Afoa vs Kyle "The Knee Assassin" Gallacher.

King in the Ring 62 kg II & 4 Women 55 kg
These Tournaments were competed on 12 April 2014 at ASB Stadium, Auckland, New Zealand. The undercard featured Mike Beavington vs David 'Sanchai' Aung, WKBF World Cruiserweight Title TY Williams vs Ben "Iron Fist" Johnson and Antz “Notorious” Nansen vs Nato Laauli.

King in the Ring 100+ kg II
These Tournaments were competed on 20 June 2014 at ASB Stadium, Auckland, New Zealand. The undercard featured Sam 'The Shank' Hill vs Sailmon Boonruam, WKBF & WMC Cruiserweight Title Pati Afoa vs Zane Hopman, Victor Mechkov vs Joe Hopkins and Sone Vannathy vs Cheyne Rees.

King in the Ring 86 kg II
These Tournaments were competed on 30 August 2014 at ASB Stadium, Auckland, New Zealand. The undercard featured Bronwyn 'Braveheart' Wylie vs Gaela 'The Slayer' Nixon, Edwin 'Electric' Samy vs Johnny 'Ruthless' Rickard, Ra 'Razor' Redden vs Jordan 'Sniper' Syme, Antz 'Notorious' Nansen vs Alofa Solitua and Hammad 'The General' Alloush vs Tafa 'Thumper' Misipati.

King in the Ring 72 kg III
These Tournaments were competed on 8 November 2014 at ASB Stadium, Auckland, New Zealand. The undercard featured Joey 'The Filipino Kid' Baylon vs Terry 'Turbo' Kounsavat, Mike 'Farmer' Fotheringhame vs Josh 'Method Man' Marsters, Sam 'the Shank' Hill vs Nathan 'Nasty Boy' Robson, Pati 'Arsenal' Afoa vs Simon 'Mayhem' Maait and Dan 'The Pain' Roberts vs Paulo 'The Barbarian' Lakai.

King in the Ring 86 kg III
These Tournaments were competed on 11 April 2015 at ASB Stadium, Auckland, New Zealand. The undercard featured Chris 'Cobra' Eades vs Jordan 'Sniper' Syme, Nato 'Hard Knocks' Laauli vs Pane 'The Punisher' Haraki, Sone 'Arch Angel' Vannathy vs Pumipi 'Ceazer' Ngaronoa and Blood Diamond vs 'Dirty' Sanchez.

† Both semi-finalists from Maait vs Hopman were injured in their bout. Due to this, both were not able to continue into the final. Pati Afoa was the only kickboxer willing to go into the finals, despite losing in the first round of the tournament.

King in the Ring 62 kg III
These Tournaments were competed on 19 June 2015 at Te Rauparaha Arena, Porirua, New Zealand. The undercard featured Kieran Garcia vs Gerard Roach, Zane 'Hybrid' Hopman vs Pati 'The Arsenal' Afoa, Gentiane 'AAA' Lupi vs Natalia 'The Hun' Teller, Nick Taylor vs Sean 'Ruthless' Redgrave and Nato 'Hard Knocks' Laauli vs Thomas 'The Island Tank' Peato.

King in the Ring 100+ kg III
These Tournaments were competed on 29 August 2015 at ASB Stadium, Auckland, New Zealand. The undercard featured Tom Williams vs Socrates Fernandes, Cody Scott vs Roman Nia, Alexi Serepisos vs Albert Xavier and Brad Riddell vs Michael Badato.

King in the Ring 100 kg II
These Tournaments were competed on 31 October 2015 at ASB Stadium, Auckland, New Zealand. The undercard featured Victor Mechkov vs Carlos Hicks, Richard Simpson vs Pati Afoa, Michelle Preston vs Kristan Armstrong, Joey Baylon vs Dayne Williams and Slav Alexeichik vs Matt Saville.

King in the Ring 75 kg I
These Tournaments were competed on 15 April 2016 at ASB Stadium, Auckland, New Zealand. The undercard featured Jeremiah Fatialofa vs Fou Ah-Lam, Junior Coleman vs Tae Park, Mario Williams vs Doug Higgins and Slav Alexeichik vs Jamie Eades.

King in the Ring 62 kg IV
These Tournaments were competed on 27 June 2016 at ASB Stadium, Auckland, New Zealand. The undercard featured Paulo ‘Barbarian’ Lakai vs Ata ‘Smiling Assassin’ Fakalelu, Michelle ‘Pressure’ Preston vs Kim Townsend, WKBF Middleweight World Title Victor Mechkov vs Nick Ariel and Dayne Williams vs Nic ‘Ice Cream’ Aratema.

† Despite winning the first round, Alexi ‘Phet’ Serepisos could not continue to the semi-finals due to a concussion. Dayne Williams who fought early that night on the undercard, took Serepisos's place in the semi-finals.

King in the Ring 92 kg I
These Tournaments were competed on 18 November 2016 at ASB Stadium, Auckland, New Zealand. The undercard featured Sigi Pesaleli vs Taylor Matthews, Hayden 'Tat North' Todd vs Victor 'Slick Vic' Mechkov, Beau 'Ruthless' Rawiri vs Eugene 'Evil Genius' Bareman, Chris 'Cobra' Eades vs Blood Diamond and Lightweight World Title Super Fight WKBF Joey 'Filipino' Kid  vs Ben Thompson.

The Force
King in the Ring promoted their first The Force series. These Tournaments were competed on 7 April 2017 at ASB Stadium, Auckland, New Zealand. The undercard featured Davor Matarugic vs Milos Rastovic, Terrence Montgomery vs Tyrene White and Taalili Wilson vs Jarrod Thompson. The event was commissioned by NZPBA (boxing) and NZMMAF (MMA).

Boxing

Kickboxing

MMA

King in the Ring 100 kg III
The Tournament will be competed on 30 June 2017 at ASB Stadium, Auckland, New Zealand. The undercard featured Moe Hussain vs Fou Ah-Lam, King Assop vs Greg Lemanu and Billy Walker vs Alex Redhead.

King in the Ring 68 kg I
The Tournament will be competed on 15 September 2017 at ASB Stadium, Auckland, New Zealand. The undercard featured Zoph Bell vs Andre MacDonald, Ben Te Tai vs Ben Petersen and WKBF New Zealand Heavyweight Title bout Taylor Matthews vs Fou Ah-Lam.

King in the Ring 86 kg IV
The Tournament was competed on 17 November 2017 at ASB Stadium, Auckland, New Zealand. The undercard featured Rasy Soth vs Ethan Sudasarna, Pong Chau vs Andre McDonald and vacant WBC Muay Thai World Super Flyweight Title bout Fani Peloumpi vs Michelle Preston.

† Despite winning the first round, Sigi Pesaleli could not continue to the semi-finals due to injury. Ramegus Te Wake who fought against Pesaleli, took his place in the semi-finals.

King in the Ring 100+ kg IV
The Tournament was on 23 March 2018 at YMCA Stadium, Auckland, New Zealand. The undercard featured Grant Heka vs Fou 'Fabulous' Ah-Lam, Hone Hepi vs Aaron Rei and Joey Parsons vs Luke Hiki.

King in the Ring 75 kg II
The Tournament was on 8 June 2018 at Te Rauparaha Arena, Porirua, New Zealand. The undercard featured Zen Neethling vs Dan Robertson, Aaron Cole vs Jon Anderson, Ty Williams vs Tony Angelov and Pettawee Sor Kittachai vs Dominic Reed.

King in the Ring 62 kg V
The Tournament was on 9 November 2018 at Barfoot & Thompson Stadium, Auckland, New Zealand. The undercard featured Jordan Maroroa vs Stefan Harrison, Patrick Dittrich vs Fou Ah-Lam, Hayden Todd vs TY Williams and Lara Ahola vs Kelly Broerse.

King in the Ring 92 kg II
The Tournament was on 30 March 2019 at Barfoot & Thompson Stadium, Auckland, New Zealand. The undercard featured Vahid Unesi vs Salam Hermez, MMA fight Aaron Tau vs Logan Price, Josh Marsters vs Haaimiora Parsons-Grace and TY Williams vs Mandela Ale.

King in the Ring 68 kg
The Tournament was on 29 June 2019 at Eventfinda Stadium, Auckland, New Zealand. The undercard featured Junior Tupufia vs Iain Clegg, Ollie Schmid vs Hayellom Tesfay, 	Davor Matarugic vs Fou Ah-Lam.

† Despite winning the first round, Jordan Syme could not continue to the semi-finals due to injury. Thomas Maguren who fought against Syme, took his place in the semi-finals.

King in the Ring 86 kg
The Tournament was on 6 September 2019 at Palmerston North, New Zealand. The undercard featured Jasmine Kiihfuss vs Tessa Key, Blair McDonald vs Anton Simeon, Aaron Arnott vs Peter Gordon, Swade Wallace vs Stacey Te Kuru, Jacob Whawell	vs Corey Dunn and David Tuitupou vs Moe Hussain.

King in the Ring 75 kg III
The Tournament was on 18 July 2020 at North Shore, New Zealand. The undercard featured Ajay Alsaeed vs Sam Parkes, Devan Syme vs Andre MacDonald, Jeeta Prasad vs Natalie Mackey, Hayellom Tesday vs Jordan Smart, Mark Timms vs Hayden Todd.

King in the Ring 62VI 
The Tournament was on 2 October 2020 at North Shore, New Zealand. The undercard featured Eden Phillips vs Tyer Hedley, Nate Law vs Elijah Taufuiaavalu and David Tuitupoa vs Thomas Peato.

King in the Ring 92III 
The Tournament was on 5 December 2020 at North Shore, New Zealand. The undercard featured Haamiora Parsons-Grace vs Victor Meckov, Professional boxing bout between Shiva Mishra vs Aung Sanda, and Lola Ferber vs Audrey Guyet.

King in the Ring 68III 
The Tournament was on 27 March 2021 at North Shore, New Zealand. The undercard featured Shem 'Money' Murdoch vs Ben 'Brawla' Sisam, Nyrene 'Neutron Bomb' Crowley vs Ayisha 'Baby Mumble' Abied, and Mike "Blood Diamond" winning the World Kickboxing Federation World light heavyweight title against Diego Beneduzzi.

Rules

Permitted techniques
All western style boxing techniques
Spinning backfists
All eastern and western kickboxing techniques with use of foot and knee
Kicking inside outside leg kicks
Grabbing neck with two hands and throwing only one knee to body or head is allowed. Fighter can continue to knee with one hand only
When fighter attempts to throw body kick, opponent can counter by grabbing leg, and may strike only once while holding leg
Flying knees to the head and body

Forbidden techniques
Hammer punch
Hitting with inside of glove
Punching or striking to opponent's groin
Punching opponent’s kidneys and neck
Elbows to head and body
Kicking or punching opponent's back
Kicking and punching while on floor
Speaking during fight
Biting/holding opponent's arm
Headbutting or throwing the opponent
Strikes to joints or spine
Kicking and punching after referee has instructed the contestant to stop round

References

External links

Kickboxing in New Zealand
Kickboxing organizations